Hejnice is a municipality and village in Ústí nad Orlicí District in the Pardubice Region of the Czech Republic. It has about 200 inhabitants.

Administrative parts
The hamlet of Křížánky is an administrative part of Hejnice.

References

External links

Villages in Ústí nad Orlicí District